Atalantia is a genus of flowering plants in the citrus family, the Rutaceae.

Taxonomy
The genus is placed in the subfamily Aurantioideae, which also includes the genus Citrus. It has been placed in the tribe Aurantieae and subtribe Citrinae, which are known as the citrus fruit trees. Atalantia and the genus Citropsis are also called near-citrus fruit trees.

Species
, Plants of the World Online accepted the following species:

Atalantia acuminata C.C.Huang
Atalantia armata (Thwaites) Guillaumin
Atalantia buxifolia (Poir.) Oliv. ex Benth.
Atalantia ceylanica (Arn.) Oliv.
Atalantia citroides Pierre ex Guillaumin
Atalantia dasycarpa C.C.Huang
Atalantia fongkaica C.C.Huang
Atalantia guillauminii Swingle
Atalantia henryi (Swingle) C.C.Huang
Atalantia kwangtungensis Merr.
Atalantia lauterbachii (Swingle) Govaerts
Atalantia linearis (Blanco) Merr.
Atalantia macrophylla (Oliv.) Kurz
Atalantia monophylla DC.
Atalantia paniculata Warb.
Atalantia racemosa Wight ex Hook.
Atalantia retusa Merr.
Atalantia rotundifolia (Thwaites) Yu.Tanaka
Atalantia roxburghiana Hook.f.
Atalantia sessiliflora Guillaumin
Atalantia simplicifolia (Roxb.) Engl.
Atalantia stenocarpa Drake
Atalantia wightii Yu.Tanaka

Ecology

Papilio polymnestor, the blue Mormon, a large swallowtail butterfly from South India and Sri Lanka can be found near Atalantia. Phyllocnistis citrella, the citrus leafminer, is a moth of the family Gracillariidae whose larvae are considered a serious agricultural pest on citrus species, such as Atalantia. Macaldenia palumba is  a moth of the family Noctuidae whose larvae feed on Atalantia.

See also 
 List of Rutaceae genera''

References

External links
 
 

Aurantioideae
Aurantioideae genera